The 2001 World Marathon Cup was the ninth edition of the World Marathon Cup of athletics and were held in Edmonton, Canada, inside of the 2001 World Championships.

Results

See also
2001 World Championships in Athletics – Men's Marathon
2001 World Championships in Athletics – Women's Marathon

References

External links
 IAAF web site

World Marathon Cup
World
1993 in Canadian sports
Marathons in Canada
International track and field competitions hosted by Canada